The 1998 NCAA Division I women's basketball tournament began on March 13, 1998, and concluded on March 29, 1998, when Tennessee won the national title. The Final Four was held at Kemper Arena in Kansas City, Missouri, on March 27–29, 1998. Tennessee, Louisiana Tech, NC State, and Arkansas qualified to the Final Four. Tennessee and Louisiana Tech won their semi-final Final Four matchups and continued on to the championship. Tennessee defeated Louisiana Tech 93–75 to take their sixth title, and complete an undefeated season (39–0).

For the first time in the men's or women's tournament, two teams, Tennessee and Liberty, entered the tournament unbeaten (this feat was replicated in 2014 by the women's teams from Connecticut and Notre Dame). In the Mideast Regional, the Lady Vols blew out Liberty 102–58. However, in the West Regional, the expected 1–16 blowout did not happen. In that matchup, Harvard defeated an injury-plagued #1 seed Stanford on its home court 71–67. This was the first time in the men's or women's tournament that a #16 seed had beaten a #1 seed, a feat that would not be repeated until 2018 in the men's tournament. In addition, 9th-seeded Arkansas made the final four, the highest seed ever to do so in the women's tournament. The ninth-seeded Razorbacks remain the lowest seeded team to ever reach the Final Four in the women's tournament. Only 10th-seeded Oregon in 2017, 10th-seeded Creighton in 2022 and 11th-seeded Gonzaga in 2011 have even reached an Elite Eight to be in position to break this record. In addition, Arkansas remains the only 9 seed to even reach the Elite Eight in the women's tournament.

Tournament records
 Free throws – Chastity Melvin, North Carolina State, attempted 15 free throws in the semi-final game against Louisiana Tech, setting the record for most free throw attempts in a Final Four game.
 Winning margin – Tennessee defeated Arkansas 86–58 in the semi-final game. The winning margin of 28 points set the record for winning margin in a Final Four game.
 Three-point field goals – Julie Krommenhoek completed eight three-point field goals in a first round game in the West region, setting the record for most three-point field goals scored in an NCAA tournament game.
 Three-point field goal percentage – Kellie Jolly, Tennessee, hit four of five three-point field goal attempts(80%) in the championship game against Louisiana Tech, tying a record for three-point field goal percentage in a Final Four game, held by four other players.
 Steals – Ticha Penicheiro, Old Dominion, recorded fourteen steals, setting the record for most steals in an NCAA tournament game, since the statistic was first recorded in 1988.
 Free throws – Purdue made 39 free throws in a Midwest region first round game against Washington, setting the record for most free throws  scored in an NCAA tournament game.
 Field goals made – Chamique Holdsclaw, Tennessee, scored 64 field goals in the tournament, setting the record for most field goals made in a tournament.
 Field goals attempted – Chamique Holdsclaw, Tennessee, attempted 131 field goals in the tournament, setting the record for most field goals attempted in a tournament.
 Steals – Ticha Penicheiro, Old Dominion, recorded 23 steals, setting the record for most steals in an NCAA tournament, since the statistic was first recorded in 1988.
 Furthest advance – Harvard, as a 16 seed, advanced to the second round, representing the only time a 16 seed has advanced.

Qualifying teams – automatic
Sixty-four teams were selected to participate in the 1998 NCAA Tournament. Thirty conferences were eligible for an automatic bid to the 1998 NCAA tournament.

Qualifying teams – at-large
Thirty-four additional teams were selected to complete the sixty-four invitations.

Bids by conference
Thirty conferences earned an automatic bid.  In nineteen cases, the automatic bid was the only representative from the conference. Thirty-four additional at-large teams were selected from eleven of the conferences.

First and second rounds

In 1998, the field remained at 64 teams. The teams were seeded, and assigned to four geographic regions, with seeds 1–16 in each region. In Round 1, seeds 1 and 16 faced each other, as well as seeds 2 and 15, seeds 3 and 14, seeds 4 and 13, seeds 5 and 12, seeds 6 and 11, seeds 7 and 10, and seeds 8 and 9. In the first two rounds, the top four seeds were given the opportunity to host the first round game. In all cases, the higher seed accepted the opportunity.

The following table lists the region, host school, venue and the sixteen first and second round locations:

Regionals and  Final Four

The Regionals, named for the general  location, were held from March 20 to March 23 at these sites:

 Mideast Regional  Memorial Gymnasium (Vanderbilt University), Nashville, Tennessee (Host:  Vanderbilt University)
 Midwest Regional  Lubbock Municipal Coliseum, Lubbock, Texas (Host: Texas Tech University)
 East Regional  University of Dayton Arena, Dayton, Ohio (Host: University of Dayton)
 West Regional  Oracle Arena,  Oakland, California (Host: University of California, Santa Barbara)

Each regional winner advanced to the  Final Four held  March 27 and March  29  in Kansas City, Missouri, at  the Kemper Arena

Bids by state

The sixty-four teams came from thirty-four states, plus Washington, D.C. Four states, California, Tennessee, Virginia and North Carolina each had the most teams with four bids. Sixteen states did not have any teams receiving bids.

Brackets
Data source

East Region – Dayton, Ohio

Mideast Region

Midwest Region

West Region

--Despite the fact that Stanford did not advance to the second round, the Arkansas-Harvard second round game was still played on Stanford’s home court.

Final Four – Kansas City, Missouri

E-East; ME-Mideast; MW-Midwest; W-West.

Record by  conference
Sixteen conferences had more than one  bid, or at least one win in NCAA Tournament play:

Fourteen conferences  went 0–1: America East, Big Sky Conference,  Big South Conference, Horizon League, MAAC, MAC, MEAC, Northeast Conference, Ohio Valley Conference,  Patriot League, Southern Conference, Southland, SWAC, and West Coast Conference

All-Tournament team

 Chamique Holdsclaw, Tennessee
 Tamika Catchings, Tennessee
 Kellie Jolly, Tennessee
 Tamicha Jackson, Louisiana Tech
 Chasity Melvin, North Carolina St.

Game officials

 Art Bomengen (semifinal)
 Melissa Barlow (semifinal)
 Karen Wilhite (semifinal)
 Dennis Mayer (semifinal)
 Scott Yarbrough (semifinal)
 Teresa Dahlem (semifinal)
 Sally Bell (final)
 Bob Trammell (final)
 Wesley Dean (final)

See also
 1997–98 Tennessee Lady Volunteers basketball team
 1998 Harvard vs. Stanford women's basketball game
1998 NCAA Division I men's basketball tournament
1998 NCAA Division II women's basketball tournament
1998 NCAA Division III women's basketball tournament
1998 NAIA Division I women's basketball tournament
1998 NAIA Division II women's basketball tournament

Notes 

 
NCAA Division I women's basketball tournament
NCAA Division I women's basketball tournament
Basketball in Lubbock, Texas
Events in Lubbock, Texas
Sports competitions in Texas